Hysterical Blindness is a 2002 American television drama film directed by Mira Nair and written by Laura Cahill, based on her stage play of the same name. It stars Gena Rowlands, Uma Thurman, Juliette Lewis, and Ben Gazzara. The film premiered at the Sundance Film Festival on January 16, 2002, and aired on HBO on August 21, 2002. In 2003, Uma Thurman won a Golden Globe Award for her portrayal of Debby Miller. Ben Gazzara and Gena Rowlands also won Best Supporting Actor/Actress awards for their performances as Virginia Miller and Nick Piccolo at the 2003 Emmy Awards. The opening titles by Trollbäck + Company won a Primetime Emmy Award for Outstanding Main Title Design in 2003.

Thurman plays an excitable New Jersey woman in the 1980s searching for romance. The San Francisco Chronicle review wrote: "Thurman so commits herself to the role, eyes blazing and body akimbo, that you start to believe that such a creature could exist — an exquisite looking woman so spastic and needy that she repulses regular Joes. Thurman has bent the role to her will".

Plot
In 1987 in Bayonne, New Jersey, Debby Miller has been diagnosed with the condition hysterical blindness in which there are times when her sight fades in and out. The doctor tells her to try to have fun with her friends. She and her best friend Beth go to their favorite pub, Ollie's, and try to find a man and have a drink. Beth flirts with the bartender, and Debby grows angry with her and goes outside where she meets Rick. He wants little to do with her, but she convinces him to escort her to her car. As a 'thank you,' she offers to buy him a drink and tells him that she will be at the same bar tomorrow.

The next day, they see each other at Ollies's, and she asks him to go somewhere else; eventually they are at his house. It is clear that Rick has little interest in Debby, so to move things along, she tells him that she 'gives a great blow job.' Afterward, she thinks she has found love, but Rick is only looking for a one-night stand. Debby goes home.

Her mother Virginia has been dating an older man, Nick, who wants her to move with him to Florida. However, Nick dies from a heart attack. Virginia realizes that until she met Nick, she lived her life, waiting for things to happen to her. In the end, Debby, Beth and Virginia struggle to find stability in their New Jersey town and agree that all they need is each other.

Cast
Uma Thurman as Debby Miller
Gena Rowlands as Virginia Miller
Juliette Lewis as Beth Toczynski
Ben Gazzara as Nick Piccolo
Justin Chambers as Rick
Jolie Peters as Amber Autumn Toczynski

Critical reception 
On review aggregate website Rotten Tomatoes, Hysterical Blindness has an approval rating of 75% based on 12 critics’ reviews. 

The film received acclaim for its performances, particularly that of Thurman, Rowlands, Lewis, and Gazzara. Caryn James of The New York Times wrote, "Beneath big hair, tight clothes and thick New Jersey accents, [Thurman and Lewis] bring enormous empathy to their roles in this small-scale, beautifully made character study about two best friends in their 20's." James also praised the direction of Mira Nair, saying she brings to the film "a quality that has been consistent throughout her career: a strong feel for the texture of a life and the people who struggle through it." Chris Gore of Film Threat said Thurman and Lewis "give what can easily be considered career-best performances." In more critical reviews, the plot was criticized as "too thin" and the cast "far superior to the film itself."

Accolades

References

External links
. Wayback Machine. Archived from the original on 2002-10-02.

2002 television films
2002 films
2002 drama films
2000s English-language films
American films based on plays
Blumhouse Productions films
American drama television films
Films directed by Mira Nair
Films scored by Lesley Barber
Films set in 1987
Films set in New Jersey
Films shot in New Jersey
HBO Films films
2002 independent films
2000s female buddy films
2000s American films